3480 is an IBM storage tape format

3480 or variant, may also refer to:

In general
 A.D. 3480, a year in the 4th millennium CE
 3480 BC, a year in the 4th millennium BCE
 3480, a number in the 3000 (number) range

Other uses
 3480 Abante, an asteroid in the Asteroid Belt, the 3480th asteroid registered
 Texas Farm to Market Road 3480, a state highway
 3480, the Strong's Concordance code for the word "Nazarene"

See also